Tripos (plural 'Triposes') are academic examinations that originated at the University of Cambridge in Cambridge, England.  They include any of several examinations required to qualify an undergraduate student for a bachelor's degree or the courses taken by a student to prepare for these. Undergraduate students studying mathematics, for instance, ultimately take the Mathematical Tripos, and students of English literature take the English Tripos.

In most traditional English universities, a student registers to study one field exclusively, rather than having "majors" or "minors" as in American, Australian, Canadian, or Scottish universities. In practice, however, most degrees may be fairly interdisciplinary in nature, depending on the subject. The multi-part tripos system at Cambridge also allows substantial changes in field between parts; the Natural Sciences Tripos is especially designed to allow a highly flexible curriculum across the sciences.

Etymology
The word has an obscure etymology, but can be traced to the three-legged stool candidates once used to sit on when taking oral examinations, known as tripods. An apocryphal legend says that students used to receive one leg of a stool in each of their three years of exams, receiving the whole stool at graduation. Another tradition holds that the name derives from the three brackets printed on the back of the voucher.

History
Initially, the only way to obtain an honours degree at Cambridge was the Mathematical Tripos examination. John Jebb proposed reforms in 1772, but implementation was blocked by various matters such as lack of expertise in the smaller colleges in a wider range of subjects. Classed examinations in law were introduced in 1816 by James William Geldart, who was then Regius Professor of Civil Law. Although a classical tripos was created in 1822, it was only open to those who already had high honours in mathematics or those who were the sons of peers. This restriction ended around 1850, and triposes in the moral sciences and natural sciences were introduced in the 1860s.

The origin and evolution of the Cambridge Tripos can be found in William Clark's Academic Charisma and the Origin of the Research University.

Structure

A tripos is divided into two parts: Part I, which is broadly based, and Part II, which allows specialization within the student's chosen field. Since a bachelor's degree usually takes three years to complete, either Part I or Part II is two years, and the other one year. The details of this can vary from subject to subject. There is also an optional Part III offered in some subjects, such as the Mathematical Tripos; these are not required to complete a bachelor's degree. Some Part III courses allow the student to graduate with both a master's degree and a bachelor's degree: for example, scientific Part III courses allow the student to graduate with an M.Sci. degree in addition to the B.A. degree which all Cambridge graduates receive. The Engineering Tripos is divided into four Parts (IA, IB, IIA, IIB), each corresponding to one academic year, and leads to the simultaneous awarding of the B.A. and M.Eng. degrees.

Students are examined formally at the end of each part and are awarded a degree classification for each part. The Part II classification is usually, but incorrectly, considered to be the classification for the overall degree. Most subjects are examined in all three years; for example, the Natural Sciences Tripos has examinations for Part IA, Part IB, Part II, and in some subjects, Part III. The English, History and ASNaC Triposes have preliminary rather than full examinations at the end of the first year, though History and English have recently scrapped Preliminary exams in the first year and moved to an IA, IB, II structure with classed examinations in all years.

Degree regulations state that, to be awarded a degree, a student must have passed two honours examinations (i.e., two Tripos examinations) – this could include a Part I and a Part II, two Part I exams, or (in some cases) a Part I and a Part IA. From October 2011, students can only be awarded an honours degree if they have been awarded honours in a Part II or Part III examination; a combination of Part I examinations will allow a student to graduate with an Ordinary degree. All students must complete at least nine terms of residence (three years of study) – making it impossible for students to simply complete two one-year tripos parts. This makes it easy for an undergraduate to switch out of a subject. So a one-year Part I (or Part IA) must be followed by a two-year Part II, and usually vice versa. More exotic combinations are possible, with the permission of the student's college and prospective department, but some combinations create a four-year bachelor's degree. A few subjects – i.e. Management Studies, Manufacturing Engineering, and Linguistics (prior to October 2010) – exist only as Part II, and can be preceded by any manner of Part I subject.

Students who already possess a bachelor's degree or equivalent from another university are generally permitted to skip Part I, and thus can complete a Cambridge bachelor's degree in two years or less. Students already holding a BA degree from Cambridge are not permitted to collect a second BA from the university.

A student requesting to graduate (technically, 'admitted to a degree') is assessed mainly on two criteria: not only the Triposes they have completed (requirements laid by the statutes and ordinances of Cambridge), as recorded in the Cambridge University Reporter (Cambridge's gazette newspaper), but also the number of terms kept (at least nine required for a BA; 10 for an undergraduate master's degree). A student's requests to graduate should also be approved by their college, and be unopposed by the regent house, one of the university's governing bodies with vetoing powers.

List of Triposes

Below is the list of Triposes offered by the university (Latin numerals in brackets indicate the Parts available):

Anglo-Saxon, Norse and Celtic Tripos (ASNaC) (I, II) (two year part I)
Archaeology Tripos (I, IIA, IIB)
Architecture Tripos (IA, IB, II)
Asian and Middle Eastern Studies (formerly Oriental Studies Tripos) (IA, IB, II)
Chemical Engineering Tripos ("Chem Eng") (I, IIA, IIB) (part IIB completion leads to M Eng in addition to BA)
Classical Tripos (IA, IB, II) (pre IA year available to those without A-level Latin/Greek)
Computer Science Tripos ("Comp Sci") (IA, IB, II, III) (part III completion leads to M Eng plus BA)
Economics Tripos (I, IIA, IIB)
Education Tripos (I, II) (two year part I)
Engineering Tripos (IA, IB, IIA, IIB) (part IIB completion leads to M Eng in addition to BA)
English Tripos (I, II) (two year part I)
Geographical Tripos (IA, IB, II)
Historical Tripos (I, II) (two year part I)
Historical Tripos (from 2022) (IA, IB, II)
History and Modern Languages Tripos (IA, IB, II) (two year part II)
History and Politics Tripos (IA, IB, II)
History and Philosophy of Science Tripos (HPS) (IB, II)
History of Art Tripos (I, IIA, IIB)
Human, Social, and Political Sciences Tripos (HSPS) (I, IIA, IIB)
Land Economy Tripos (IA, IB, II)
Law Tripos (IA, IB, II)
Linguistics Tripos (I, IIA, IIB) 
Management Studies Tripos ("Part II" only; the Management Studies Tripos is a one-year course)
Manufacturing Engineering Tripos (I, II) (part III completion leads to M Eng in addition to BA)
Mathematical Tripos (IA, IB, II, III) (part III completion leads to MMath in addition to a BA)
Medical Sciences Tripos (MedST) (IA, IB)
Modern and Medieval Languages Tripos (MML) (IA, IB, II)
Music Tripos (IA, IB, II)
Natural Sciences Tripos ("Nat Sci") (IA, IB, II, III) (part III completion leads to M Sci in addition to a BA)
Philosophy Tripos (IA, IB, II)
Psychological and Behavioural Sciences Tripos (I, IIA, IIB)
Theological and Religious Studies Tripos (I, IIA, IIB)
Veterinary Sciences Tripos (VetST) (IA, IB)

Triposes recently abolished, renamed or restructured
Oriental Studies Tripos
Education Studies Tripos
Linguistics Tripos (Old Regulations)
Archaeology and Anthropology Tripos
Politics, Psychology and Sociology [PPS] Tripos
Medical and Veterinary Sciences Tripos (MVST); split into separate Medical and Veterinary Sciences Triposes (MedST/VetST) from October 2018.

See also 
 Honour Moderations (Oxford)
 Master of Arts (Oxbridge and Dublin)
 Wooden spoon (award)
 Wrangler (University of Cambridge)

References

Academic courses at the University of Cambridge
History of the University of Cambridge
Terminology of the University of Cambridge